William Warren Peace (August 6, 1921 – November 3, 2002) was an American Negro league pitcher for the Newark Eagles between 1945 and 1947.

A native of Kittrell, North Carolina, Peace pitched for Newark's 1946 Negro World Series champion club. He died in Chester, Pennsylvania, in 2002 at age 81.

References

External links
 and Seamheads
 Warren Peace at Negro Leagues Baseball Museum

1921 births
2002 deaths
Newark Eagles players
People from Kittrell, North Carolina
Baseball players from North Carolina
Baseball pitchers
20th-century African-American sportspeople
21st-century African-American people